Christina Rost ( Mäbert, born 14 August 1952 in Chemnitz, East Germany) is a German former women's team handball player. She had her biggest success with the national team of East Germany, winning the women's world cup in 1975, the Olympic silver medal in 1976 in Montreal and, four years later, the Olympic bronze medal in Moscow.

Rost played for SC Leipzig nationally. She played 170 international matches for East Germany. She is married to Peter Rost, another team handball player and Olympic gold medalist. Their son Frank did not follow in the tradition; he was a professional football goalkeeper for MLS team New York Red Bulls (2011).

References

External links 
 Christina Rost at Munzinger Archiv (German)

1952 births
Living people
German female handball players
Handball players at the 1976 Summer Olympics
Handball players at the 1980 Summer Olympics
Olympic handball players of East Germany
Olympic silver medalists for East Germany
Olympic bronze medalists for East Germany
Sportspeople from Chemnitz
Olympic medalists in handball
Medalists at the 1980 Summer Olympics
Medalists at the 1976 Summer Olympics
East German female handball players
People from Bezirk Karl-Marx-Stadt